Chenopodiastrum murale, (Syn. Chenopodium murale) is a species of plant in the family Amaranthaceae known by the common names nettle-leaved goosefoot, Australian-spinach, salt-green, and sowbane. This plant is native to Europe and parts of Asia and northern Africa, but it is widespread worldwide, particularly in tropical and subtropical areas due to the ease of it being introduced. It is a common weed of fields and roadsides.

Description
This is an annual herb reaching 70 centimeters in height with an erect stem which is usually red or red-streaked green and leafy with green foliage. The oval to triangular leaves are toothed and broad, smooth on the upper surface and powdery on the undersides.

The inflorescences are powdery clusters of spherical buds. The buds do not open into typical flower blossoms but remain with the sepals covering the ovary as the fruit develops.

Uses
The seeds are edible, and the shoots, stalks, and leaves can be eaten as greens. The 1889 book 'The Useful Native Plants of Australia records that common names include "Australian Spinach" and "Fat-hen". It also states that it is a "pot-herb", which may be utilised in the same manner as spinach. It is called oñk i:waki in Oʼodham, 'salt greens'. Although an introduced plant, it has become a summer green commonly collected from the wild -one of the hottest and more arid areas of North America.

Care should be taken not to confuse this species with deadly black nightshade, which looks similar when young. The leaves of Chenopodium murale have a white mealy texture, and the axils have a red streak.

References

External links
 
 Chenopodiastrum murale at Tropicos
Jepson Manual Treatment
USDA Plants Profile
Flora of North America Treatment
Photo gallery

Chenopodioideae
Flora of Europe
Edible nuts and seeds
Leaf vegetables
Plants described in 1753
Taxa named by Carl Linnaeus